So Fresh: The Hits of Summer 2007 Plus the Best of 2006 is a compilation of the latest songs that were popular in Australia. This particular version includes "the best of 2006", featuring the best music of all 2006 compilations. It was released on 25 November 2006. It was the number one compilation album in the 2006 End of Year ARIA Charts. The album also was certified quintuple platinum in 2007.

Track listing

CD 1
 Justin Timberlake featuring Timbaland – "SexyBack" (4:03)
 Scissor Sisters – "I Don't Feel Like Dancin'" (4:48)
 Nelly Furtado – "Maneater" (3:17)
 Pink – "U + Ur Hand" (3:33)
 Sandi Thom – "What If I'm Right" (2:56)
 The Pussycat Dolls – "I Don't Need a Man" (3:40)
 Rihanna – "We Ride" (3:56)
 Stephanie McIntosh – "Tightrope" (3:02)
 Christina Aguilera – "Hurt" (4:02)
 TV Rock – "Bimbo Nation" (3:13)
 James Morrison – "You Give Me Something" (3:32)
 Guy Sebastian – "Taller, Stronger, Better" (3:47)
 Ne-Yo – "When You're Mad" (3:40)
 Beyoncé – "Irreplaceable" (3:48)
 Nick Lachey – "I Can't Hate You Anymore" (3:53)
 Young Divas – "Happenin' All Over Again" (3:28)
 Human Nature – "Dancing in the Street" (2:55)
 The Black Eyed Peas – "Pump It" (3:34)
 Sugababes – "Red Dress" (3:36)
 Girlband – "Party Girl" (3:26)

CD 2
 Fergie – "London Bridge" (3:28)
 Shakira featuring Carlos Santana – "Illegal" (3:53)
 The Killers – "When You Were Young" (3:39)
 Wolfmother – "Joker & the Thief" (3:29)
 Rogue Traders – "In Love Again" (3:40)
 Nickelback – "If Everyone Cared" (3:36)
 The Fray – "How to Save a Life" (4:23)
 Augie March – "One Crowded Hour" (4:13)
 Anthony Callea – "Live for Love" (3:45)
 Westlife – "You Raise Me Up" (4:00)
 Ashlee Simpson – "L.O.V.E." (2:33)
 Lindsay Lohan – "Confessions of a Broken Heart (Daughter to Father)" (3:40)
 Snow Patrol – "Chasing Cars" (4:26)
 Delta Goodrem – "Together We Are One" (4:14)
 Erica Baxter – "I Spy" (3:31)
 Chris Lake featuring Laura V – "Changes" (3:14)
 Melissa Tkautz – "Easily Affected" (3:58)
 Sérgio Mendes featuring The Black Eyed Peas – "Mas que Nada" (4:23)
 Chicane featuring Tom Jones – "Stoned in Love" (3:38)
 Chamillionaire featuring Krayzie Bone – "Ridin'" (5:05)

Charts

Certifications

See also
So Fresh
2006 in music
2007 in music

References

External links
 Latest Albums from So Fresh

So Fresh albums
2006 compilation albums
2007 in Australian music